CT3 or CT-3 may refer to:
Chris Taylor (baseball) (born 1990), American baseball player
Connecticut's 3rd congressional district
Connecticut Route 3, state route
Crazy Taxi 3: High Roller
CT-3 needle for surgical suturing